The 2019–20 High Point Panthers men's basketball team represented High Point University in the 2019–20 NCAA Division I men's basketball season. The Panthers, led by second-year head coach Tubby Smith, played their home games at the Millis Athletic Convocation Center in High Point, North Carolina, as members of the Big South Conference. They finished the season 9–23, 6–12 in Big South play to finish in a tie for tenth place. They lost in the first round of the Big South tournament to USC Upstate.

Previous season
The Panthers finished the 2018–19 season 16–15 overall, 9–7 in Big South play to finish in a tie for fifth place. In the Big South tournament, they were defeated by Gardner–Webb in the quarterfinals.

Roster

Schedule and results

|-
!colspan=12 style=| Exhibition

|-
!colspan=12 style=| Non-conference regular season

|-
!colspan=9 style=| Big South Conference regular season

|-
!colspan=12 style=| Big South tournament
|-

|-

Source

References

High Point Panthers men's basketball seasons
High Point Panthers
High Point Panthers men's basketball
High Point Panthers men's basketball